Drums of Fate is a 1923 American silent drama film directed by Charles Maigne and starring Mary Miles Minter. It was adapted by Will M. Ritchey from the novel "Sacrifice" by Stephen French Whitman. It was also referred to as "Drums of Destiny" in some promotional material. As with many of Minter's features, it is thought to be a lost film.

Plot
As described in various film magazine reviews, Carol Dolliver (Minter), a young society girl, rejects her guardian's (Fawcett) choice of a suitor in favour of the dashing explorer Laurence "Larry" Teck (Flynn). After their wedding, Larry returns to Africa without Carol, where he is captured by a band of native warriors.

News reaches Carol that her husband has been slain, and so, to please her guardian, she weds the crippled musician David Verne (Ferguson), although she does not love him. Meanwhile Larry has befriended the native king (Johnson) and eventually manages to escape and return to Carol.

Having believed him to be dead, Carol's initial reaction to Larry's return is one of shock rather than welcome. This, along with the news of her marriage to Verne, convinces Larry that it would be best for him to return to Africa and to the native king, leaving a note for Carol telling her to divorce him.

The shock of Larry's reappearance proves fatal to the ailing Verne, and so Carol decides to pursue her husband to Africa. Although she is almost captured by natives, she eventually discovers Larry in an African village, and the two are happily reunited.

Cast

Mary Miles Minter as Carol Dolliver
Maurice 'Lefty' Flynn as Laurence Teck
George Fawcett as Felix Brantome
Robert Cain as Cornelius Rysbroek
Casson Ferguson as David Verne
Bertram Grassby as Hamoud Bin-Said
Noble Johnson as Native King

References

External links

1923 films
1920s English-language films
Silent American drama films
1923 drama films
Paramount Pictures films
Films directed by Charles Maigne
American black-and-white films
American silent feature films
Lost American films
Lost drama films
1923 lost films
1920s American films